Lyudmyla Pekur (born 6 January 1981 in Chernihiv) is a former Ukrainian footballer who last played for Ryazan VDV in the Russian Championship. She previously played for Lehenda Chernihiv and Zhytlobud-1 Kharkiv in the Ukrainian league and Kubanochka, Nadezhda Noginsk, Rossiyanka, Energiya Voronezh and Zvezda Perm in the Russian Championship. She first played the UEFA Women's Cup in 2004 with Zhytlobud-1, and later with Rossiyanka and Zvezda.

She was a member of the Ukrainian national team. In the 2009 European Championship she scored the winner in Ukraine's victory over the host Finland, sealing Ukraine's first win in an official women's football international tournament.

She is the first Ukrainian player to have made 100 or more appearances for her national teams.

Official international goals
 2003 World Cup qualification
 1 in Ukraine 4–1 Czech Republic
 2005 European Championship qualification
 1 in Portugal 1–2 Ukraine
 2007 World Cup qualification
 1 in Ukraine 2–1 Serbia and Montenegro
 1 in Ukraine 6–0 Greece
 2009 European Championship qualification
 1 in Slovakia 0–4 Ukraine
 1 in Ukraine 5–0 Slovakia
 2009 European Championship
 1 in Ukraine 1–0 Finland
 2011 World Cup qualification
 1 in Poland 4–1 Ukraine
 2 in Ukraine 7–0 Bosnia and Herzegovina

References

1981 births
Living people
Footballers from Chernihiv
Ukrainian women's footballers
Ukraine women's international footballers
Ukrainian expatriate women's footballers
WFC Donchanka Donetsk players
WFC Lehenda-ShVSM Chernihiv players
WFC Zhytlobud-1 Kharkiv players
Expatriate women's footballers in Russia
Kubanochka Krasnodar players
Nadezhda Noginsk players
WFC Rossiyanka players
Zvezda 2005 Perm players
Ryazan-VDV players
Women's association football midfielders
Ukrainian expatriate sportspeople in Russia
FIFA Century Club